Muhannad Al-Faresi  (born 22 August 1991) is a Saudi football player who currently plays as a forward for Al-Entesar.

References

External links 
 

1991 births
Living people
Saudi Arabian footballers
Al-Wehda Club (Mecca) players
Al-Ahli Saudi FC players
Damac FC players
Al-Shoulla FC players
Al-Nahda Club (Saudi Arabia) players
Al-Adalah FC players
Al-Ain FC (Saudi Arabia) players
Al Safa FC players
Al-Entesar Club players
Sportspeople from Jeddah
Saudi First Division League players
Saudi Professional League players
Saudi Second Division players
Association football midfielders